Munishwar Chandar Dawar (born 16 January 1946) is an Indian physician . He is known for treating needy people for twenty rupees. In 2023, he has been awarded the Padma Shri by the Indian Government for his contribution in the field of medicine.

Early life and education
Dawar was born on 16 January 1946 in Punjab, India. After the partition of India and Pakistan, he moved to Jalandhar in Punjab. His schooling was in Jalandhar. He completed his MBBS from Jabalpur in 1967.

Career
Dawar started his career in 1971 by joining the Army as a doctor during the Indo-Pak war. In 1972, he started his practice in Jabalpur and he charged rupees two. In March 2022, he increased his fee to twenty rupees.

Awards
 Padma Shri in 2023

References

1940s births
Recipients of the Padma Shri in medicine
Living people